Arrow Special Parts is an Italian motorcycle exhaust system manufacturer founded in 1985.

History
Arrow was founded in 1985 in Italy by Giorgio Giannelli to make high performance exhaust systems. The company's first association with motorsports success was with Belgian rider Jobé winning the 500 cc Motocross World Championship.

Since 2000 Arrow parts have been used on bikes that won 20 World Titles, in SBK, SS, MX and Supermoto. In 2008, Arrow was associated with winners of the MX1 World Championship, with David Philippaerts, S2 Supermoto World Championship with Adrien Chareyre, and SS World Championship with Andrew Pitt.

Arrow also makes steering dampers and competition footpegs.

See also 

List of Italian companies

References

Auto parts suppliers of Italy
Motorcycle parts manufacturers
Italian brands
Italian companies established in 1985
Automotive companies established in 1985
Exhaust systems